London to Memphis is a compilation album by Mott the Hoople. It was released in 1992 by Sony Music Distribution as both a cassette and a CD.

Track listing

References

Mott the Hoople albums
1992 compilation albums